William Dillingham, D.D. (c. 1617–1689) was an English academic in the 17th century, known as a Neo-Latin poet.

Dillingham was born in Barnwell, Northamptonshire and educated at Oundle School. He entered Emmanuel College, Cambridge in 1636 and graduated B.A in 1640 and M.A. in 1643. He was Fellow from 1642 until 1653, and Master from1653 to 1662. He was Vice-Chancellor of the University of Cambridge from 1659 to 1660. He was Rector of Odell, Bedfordshire from 1662 until his death in 1689.

References 

 

17th-century English Anglican priests
Alumni of Emmanuel College, Cambridge
Fellows of Emmanuel College, Cambridge
Vice-Chancellors of the University of Cambridge
Masters of Emmanuel College, Cambridge
People from Northamptonshire
1689 deaths
People educated at Oundle School
New Latin-language poets
17th-century Latin-language writers